Langdon is a hamlet in north Cornwall approximately five miles north of Launceston; it is west of Canworthy. Langdon sits at 50.6839’ latitude and -4.40239954’ longitude.

References

https://getoutside.ordnancesurvey.co.uk/local/langdon-cornwall

Hamlets in Cornwall